Roissy can refer to:
Roissy-en-Brie in the Seine-et-Marne département in France
Roissy-en-France in the Val-d'Oise département in France
The hamlet of Roissy, within the commune of Ormoy, Essonne in France
Roissy-Charles de Gaulle Airport, located near Roissy-en-France